Ko Kizhan Adikal Ravi Neeli was the traditional title of the queens/princesses of the Chera Perumal kingdom in medieval south India. It was initially assumed that Kizhan Adikal was a proper given name (and not a royal title).

The title was used by Kerala princesses (in the Tamil country) even after their marriages to Chola princes.

Records 
The title appears in the following inscriptions discovered from Kerala and Tamil Nadu.

Records associated with the Cholas 
 "Ko Kizhan Adikal", mother of Chola prince Rajaditya, in a Tirunavalur/Tirumanallur inscription (c. 935 AD, 28th regnal year) of Chola king Parantaka I (907 — 955 AD) (EI VII, 19a).
Lalgudi record of Cankaran Kunrappozhan, from Nandikkarai Puttur in Malainatu (Kerala), mentioning "Cheramanar makalar" "Ko Kizhan Adikal" (queen of Parantaka).
 "Ravi Neeli" or "Kizhan Adikal ", daughter of "Cheramanar" or "Keralaraja" Vijayaraga, in a Tiruvotriyur inscription (936 AD, 29th regnal year) of king Parantaka I (Index 17 & SII III, 103).
 "Kizhan Adikal" appears in the Tiruvalla copper plates with her husband king Parantaka I (lines 109-111) (Index A80 & TAS II, III).

There is a possibility that the princesses (1) and (3) are the same, or are sisters. If they were sisters, king Parantaka I married two distinct Chera Perumal princesses (the mothers of his two sons, Rajaditya and Arinjaya Chola). The marriage between a Chera princess and Parantaka, c. 910 CE, is mentioned in the Udayendiram plates of Ganga king Prthivipati II Hastimalla.

The velam of the Kizhan Adikal ("Kizhan Adikal Velam" or "Kizhai Velam") at Tanjavur is mentioned in three Chola inscriptions.

 Saranganatha Perumal Temple, Tiruchirai, Kumbakonam (5th regnal year) (SII 19, 150).
 Vedaranyeswara Temple, Vedaranyam, Tirutturaippundi, Tanjore (Parantaka I, 43rd regnal year) (SII 17, 530).
 Nageswaraswamin Temple, Kumbakonam (Aditya II Karikala, 4th regnal year, the mother of Rajaditya) — as "Udaya Pirattiyar Kizhan Adikal" (SII 3, 201).

Other Chera Perumal records 
 "Ravi Neeli alias Kizhan Adikal", daughter of Kulasekhara and wife of Vijayaraga, in a Tirunandikkara inscription (9th century AD) (Index A7 & TAS IV, 36).
"Chatira Sikhamani alias Kizhan Adikal" or "Perumattiyar" in a Trikkakara inscription (953 AD) with Chera king Indu Goda (10th century AD) (Index A24 & TAS III, 36).
"Kizhan Adikal" in a Tiruvanchuli/Tiruvalanjuli temple (Tanjore) inscription mentioning Chera Perumal Rama Kulasekhara (fl. late 11th century AD) (SII III, 221).

References 

10th-century Indian women
10th-century Indian people
Chola dynasty